Madeeha Hasan Odhaib (born Madhiha Hassan al-Mosuwi) is an aid worker for the Iraqi government who some people have begun calling as the "Mother Teresa of Baghdad." In 2008, she was selected by Time magazine as one of the most influential people in the world.

References

The Mother Teresa of Baghdad Time magazine

External links
 "Mother Teresa of Baghdad." (Video).

Living people
People from Baghdad
Iraqi Shia Muslims
Madhiha Hassan
Year of birth missing (living people)